Ramon Airbase (Basis Hayil-HaAvir Ramon, lit. Ramon Air Force Base) is an Israeli Air Force base southwest of Beersheba, near the town of Mitzpe Ramon. Also titled Kanaf 25 (lit. Wing 25), it was formerly known as Matred. It was built as the result of joint Israeli and US government funding as part of the IAF's redeployment out of its bases in the Sinai after the peninsula was handed over to Egypt following the 1978 Camp David Accords. It was constructed between 1979 and 1982 by Air Base Constructors, a joint venture of Guy F. Atkinson Company, sponsor, (San Francisco); Dillingham Corporation (Honolulu); and Nello L. Teer Company (Durham, N.C.) in association with Tippetts-Abbett-McCarthy-Stratton (New York City).

Its current commander is Col. Zvi Levi.

Units
 113th Squadron – operating AH-64D
 119th Squadron – operating F-16I
 190th Squadron – operating AH-64A
 201st Squadron – operating F-16I
 253rd Squadron – operating F-16I

See also
List of airports in Israel

References

External links

 Ramon Airbase
 Mitzpe Ramon Airfield

Airports in Israel
Israeli Air Force bases